The Perlodidae, also known as the perlodid stoneflies, stripetails, or springflies, are a family of stoneflies.

Natural history
The family Perlodidae is composed of at least 50 genera and over 350 species, with the fossil records extending at least from the Triassic. The majority of perlodid stoneflies are univoltine - one generation occurs per year. Usually, adults emerge from April to June. Many species have an egg diapause during the warmer months; this allows them to inhabit otherwise unfriendly environments like temporary seeps or streams. Larvae have flattened bodies, often with patterns on their heads and thoraces, long tails, and divergent hind wing pads. Unlike the similar common stoneflies, perlodid larvae do not have branching gills on their thoraces. The perlodids are found throughout North America.

Habit and habitat
The Perlodidae are generally lotic and lentic erosional. These habitats are flowing streams or pools that contain sediments, vascular plants, and detritus. They are most often found in cool, clear streams with rocky bottoms. They are found under rocks and in coarse particulate organic matter where many prey are to be found. The larvae are generally considered to be clingers as can be seen by their wide stance for gripping substrates.

Functional feeding group
The perlodid larvae are mostly predators that engulf their prey, although a few species are scrapers and collector-gatherers. They will eat a variety of small invertebrates, but they are also known to eat plant matter, especially when young.

Genera
These 57 genera belong to the family Perlodidae:

 Afroperlodes Miron & Zwick, 1973
 Arcynopteryx Klapálek, 1904
 Baumannella Stark & Stewart, 1985
 Besdolus Ricker, 1952
 Bulgaroperla Raušer, 1966
 Calliperla Banks, 1948
 Cascadoperla Szczytko & Stewart, 1979
 Chernokrilus Ricker, 1952
 Clioperla Needham & Claassen, 1925
 Cosumnoperla Szczytko & Bottorff, 1987
 Cultus Ricker, 1952
 Dictyogenus Klapálek, 1904
 Diploperla Needham & Claassen, 1925
 Diura Billberg, 1820
 Filchneria Klapálek, 1908
 Frisonia Ricker, 1943
 Guadalgenus Stark & Gonzalez del Tanago, 1986
 Hedinia Navás, 1936
 Helopicus Ricker, 1952
 Hemimelaena Klapálek, 1907
 Hydroperla Frison, 1935
 Isogenoides Klapálek, 1912
 Isogenus Newman, 1833
 Isoperla Banks, 1906
 Kaszabia Raušer, 1968
 Kogotus Ricker, 1952
 Levanidovia Teslenko & Zhiltzova, 1989
 Malirekus Ricker, 1952
 Megaperlodes Yokoyama, Isobe & Yamamoto, 1990
 Megarcys Klapálek, 1912
 Mesoperlina Klapálek, 1921
 Neofilchneria Zwick, 1973
 Neowuia Li & Murányi, 2017
 Oconoperla Stark & Stewart, 1982
 Oroperla Needham, 1933
 Osobenus Ricker, 1952
 Ostrovus Ricker, 1952
 Perlinodes Needham & Claassen, 1925
 Perlodes Banks, 1903
 Perlodinella Klapálek, 1912
 Pictetiella Illies, 1966
 Protarcys Klapálek, 1912
 Pseudomegarcys Kohno, 1946
 Rauserodes Zwick, 1999
 Remenus Ricker, 1952
 Rickera Jewett, 1954
 Salmoperla Baumann & Lauck, 1987
 Setvena Ricker, 1952
 Skwala Ricker, 1943
 Sopkalia Ricker, 1952
 Stavsolus Ricker, 1952
 Susulus Bottorff & Stewart, 1989
 Tadamus Ricker, 1952
 Yugus Ricker, 1952
 Zhiltzovaia Özdikmen, 2008
 † Derancheperla Sinitshenkova, 1990
 † Isoperlodes Sinitshenkova, 1992

References

 Voshell, J.R. A Guide to Common Freshwater Invertebrates of North America. McDonald and Woodward. Blacksburg, Va. 2002.
 Merritt and Cummins. An Introduction to the Aquatic insects of North America 3rd ed. Kendall Hunt. Dubuque, Iowa. 1996.

 
Plecoptera families